The Kalenjin are a Nilotic people living in Kenya. They speak Kalenjin language which is spoken in dialects specific to individual contingent tribes and/or sub-tribes. The system observes that every name of a person, object or place has a meaning. The system has been subject to westernization and attrition to linguistics due to the Kenyan adoption of Swahili language as a lingua-franca and the dynamic view that indigenous languages are provincial and irrelevant.

Naming is referred to as Kogoochinet-aab Kainaiik. Names are referred to as Kainaiik.

Names of People

Masculine Names

First Name (Kip/Kib Name) 
The first name of the Kipsigis males is prefixed by the term 'Kip and then added a suffix descriptive of the prenatal, natal or post-natal places or time or weather and situations. It was to be widely used before initiation and rarely after, only as the mother mourns a dead soldier son or during divorce.

 Patronymic 'Araap' Surname 
After males were initiated at about their late teenage and early adulthood, they would come out as having achieved citizenship of the Kipsigis jurisdiction and would be accorded a patronymic surname derived from the first name of the father. For instance, if the father is named Kiptoo, his son after being initiated is accorded the name Araap Too. 

 Feminine Names 

 Firstname (Che/Chep names) 

 Matronymic 'Tab' Maiden Name Other female namesA barren woman however could marry another woman under marriage custom called Kitunji Toloj in order to ensure that she had children to pass on her property. She is thus taken for a "man" i.e. had to pay for dowry. She is then referred to as Chemenjo or Chepotipiik'''''.

Names of Places 
Naming of places followed acquisition of territory of another 'foreigners' or establishment of new village settlements. Places were usually named after trees, wildlife, prominent personalities and/or peculiarity of the locality. Place names could also have been borrowed after successful expeditions of territory expansion thus names of such earlier inhabitants may be retained.

References

See also
 Kalenjin name

Names by culture

Naming system